The Müller-Lyer illusion is an optical illusion consisting of three stylized arrows. When viewers are asked to place a mark on the figure at the midpoint, they tend to place it more towards the "tail" end. The illusion was devised by Franz Carl Müller-Lyer (1857–1916), a German sociologist, in 1889.

A variation of the same effect (and the most common form in which it is seen today) consists of a set of arrow-like figures. Straight line segments of equal length comprise the "shafts" of the arrows, while shorter line segments (called the fins) protrude from the ends of the shaft. The fins can point inwards to form an arrow "head" or outwards to form an arrow "tail". The line segment forming the shaft of the arrow with two tails is perceived to be longer than that forming the shaft of the arrow with two heads.

Variation in perception 

Research has shown that sensation of the Müller-Lyer illusion can vary. Around the turn of the 20th century, W. H. R. Rivers noted that indigenous people of the Australian Murray Island were less susceptible to the Müller-Lyer illusion than were Europeans.  Rivers suggested that this difference may be because Europeans live in more rectilinear environments than the islanders. Similar results were also observed by John W. Berry in his work on Inuit, urban Scots, and the Temne people in the 1960s.

In 1963, Segall, Campbell and Herskovitz compared susceptibility to four different visual illusions in three population samples of Caucasians, twelve of Africans, and one from the Philippines. For the Müller-Lyer illusion, the mean fractional misperception of the length of the line segments varied from 1.4% to 20.3%. The three European-derived samples were the three most susceptible samples, while the San foragers of the Kalahari desert were the least susceptible.

In 1965, following a debate between Donald T. Campbell and Melville J. Herskovits on whether culture can influence such basic aspects of perception such as the length of a line, they suggested that their student Marshall Segall investigate the problem.  In their definitive paper of 1966, they investigated seventeen cultures and showed that people in different cultures differ substantially on how they experience the Müller-Lyer stimuli.  They wrote that "European and American city dwellers have a much higher percentage of rectangularity in their environments than non-Europeans and so are more susceptible to that illusion."

They also used the word "carpentered" for the environments that Europeans mostly live in - characterized by straight lines, right angles, and square corners.

These conclusions were challenged in later work by Gustav Jahoda, who compared members of an African tribe living in a traditional rural environment with members of same group living in African cities.  Here, no significant difference in susceptibility to the M-L illusion was found.  Subsequent work by Jahoda suggested that retinal pigmentation may have a role in the differing perceptions on this illusion, and this was verified later by Pollack (1970). It is believed now that not "carpenteredness", but the density of pigmentation in the eye is related to susceptibility to the M-L illusion. Dark-skinned people often have denser eye pigmentation.
 
A later study was conducted in 1978 by Ahluwalia on children and young adults from Zambia. Subjects from rural areas were compared with subjects from urban areas. The subjects from urban areas were shown to be considerably more susceptible to the illusion, as were younger subjects. While this by no means confirms the carpentered world hypothesis as such, it provides evidence that differences in the environment can create differences in the perception of the Müller-Lyer illusion, even within a given culture. Experiments have been reported suggesting that pigeons perceive the standard Müller-Lyer illusion, but not the reversed. Experiments on parrots have also been reported with similar results.

Perspective explanation

One possible explanation, given by Richard Gregory, is that the Müller-Lyer illusion occurs because the visual system learns that the "angles in" configuration corresponds to an rectilinear object, such as the convex corner of a room, which is closer, and the "angles out" configuration corresponds to an object which is far away, such as the concave corner of a room. However, in a recent report Catherine Howe and Dale Purves contradicted Gregory's explanation:
Although Gregory's intuition about the empirical significance of the Müller-Lyer stimulus points in the right general direction (i.e., an explanation based on past experience with the sources of such stimuli), convex and concave corners contribute little if anything to the Müller-Lyer effect.

Neural nets in the visual system of human beings learn how to make a very efficient interpretation of 3D scenes. That is why when somebody goes away from us, we do not perceive them as getting shorter. And when we stretch one arm and look at the two hands we do not perceive one hand smaller than the other. Visual illusions are sometimes held to show us that what we see is an image created in our brain. Our brain supposedly projects the image of the smaller hand to its correct distance in our internal 3D model. This is what is called the size constancy mechanism hypothesis.

In the Müller-Lyer illusion, the visual system would in this explanation detect the depth cues, which are usually associated with 3D scenes, and incorrectly decide it is a 3D drawing. Then the size constancy mechanism would make us see an erroneous length of the object which, for a true perspective drawing, would be farther away.

In the perspective drawing in the figure, we see that in usual scenes the heuristic works quite well. The width of the rug should obviously be considered shorter than the length of the wall in the back.

Centroid explanation

According to the so-called centroid hypothesis, judgments of distance between visual objects are strongly affected by the neural computation of the centroids of the luminance profiles of the objects, in that the position of the centroid of an image determines its perceived location. Morgan et al., suggest that the visual procedure of centroid extraction is causally related to a spatial pooling of the positional signals evoked by the neighboring object parts. Though the integration coarsens the positional acuity, such pooling seems to be quite biologically substantiated since it allows fast and reliable assessment of the location of the visual object as whole, irrespective of its size, the shape complexity, and illumination conditions. Concerning the Müller-Lyer and similar illusions, the pattern of neural excitation evoked by contextual flank (e.g., the Müller-Lyer wings themselves) overlaps with that caused by the stimulus terminator (e.g., the wings apex), thereby leading (due to the shift of the centroid of summed excitation) to its perceptual displacement. The crucial point in the centroid explanation regarding the positional shifts of the stimulus terminators in the direction of the centroids of contextual flanks was confirmed in psychophysical examination of illusory figures with rotating distractors. The relative displacement of all stimulus terminators leads to misjudgment of distances between them; that is, the illusion occurs as a side effect due to necessarily low spatial resolution of the neural mechanism of assessment of the relative location of the visual objects. Besides, it was shown  that well-known asymmetry in manifestation of the wings-in and wings-out modifications of the Müller-Lyer illusion can be successfully explained by supplemental effects of the filled-space illusion.

References

External links
Müller-Lyer Illusion
Dynamic Müller-Lyer Illusion by Gianni A. Sarcone
Visual explanation of the color spreading effect in the Müller-Lyer illusion
The Müller-Lyer illusion explained by the statistics of image–source relationships
NAKAMURA Noriyuki (Müller-Lyer Illusion in pigeons)
The Muller-Lyer Illusion explained by Rochester Institute of Technology

Optical illusions